Magnesium malate, the magnesium salt of malic acid,  is a mineral supplement often used for nutritional concerns. It is represented by the chemical formula C4H4MgO5 and has a molecular weight of 156.376 g/mol. Magnesium malate is discussed as being a more bioavailable form of magnesium, along with other forms such as citrate and glycinate.

References

Magnesium compounds
Malates
Dietary supplements